Kalmansky District is an administrative and municipal district (raion), one of the fifty-nine in Altai Krai, Russia. It is located in the northern central part of the krai. Its administrative center is the rural locality (a selo) of Kalmanka. Population:  The population of Kalmanka accounts for 24.0% of the district's total population.

The district is bordered on the north by Pavlovsky District and the City of Barnaul, on the east by Pervomaysky District, on the south and west by Topchikhinsky District.

Geography
Kalmansky District is located in the north-central region of Altai Krai.  The Ob River River runs south-to-north through the eastern side of the district, with the administrative center of Kalmanka on the west bank.  The terrain is mostly rolling agricultural plain of the Priobsky Plateau, with forests on the meandering floodplain of the Baruaulka River, which runs along the northern border of the district.  The district is 45 km south of the regional city of Barnaul, and 2,900 km east of Moscow.  The area measures 50 km (north-south), and 50 km (west-east); total area is 1,820 km2 (about 2% of Altai Krai).

Climate
The climate is Humid continental climate, cool summer, (Dfb). This climate is characterized by large swings in temperature, both diurnally and seasonally, with mild summers and cold, snowy winters.

References

Notes

Sources

Districts of Altai Krai